State Highway 50 (SH-50) is a  state highway in the U.S. State of Idaho. SH-50 starts at U.S. Route 30 (US-30) before connecting to Interstate 84 (I-84) and ending at SH-25. It provides eastern access to the city of Twin Falls from I-84.

Route description
State Highway 50 starts at an intersection with US 30 near the town of Kimberly in Twin Falls County; the latter continues west into the city of Twin Falls. The highway continues east as a road named North 3800 East before turning to the northeast and crossing the Snake River on the Hansen Bridge into Jerome County. SH-50 continues as the road South 1150 East to a diamond interchange with I-84, where there is a truck stop on the southwest side of the interchange along a frontage road, as well as some commercial establishments on the southwest and northeast sides of the interchange.

After crossing the freeway at an overpass, SH-50 continues due north before briefly turning east onto the road East 900 South. The road curves to the north again as it makes a sharp turn onto the road South 1300 East. SH-50 ends at an intersection with SH-25, where SH-25 makes a sharp turn from south to east; a connector route continues straight onto SH-25 heading north, while the main route curves to the east, continuing onto SH-25 heading due east. SH-50 passes through farmland for its entire length. Despite its status as a connector route, SH-50 is not part of the National Highway System (NHS), a network of roadways important to the country's economy, defense, and mobility.

Junction list

Connector route

State Highway 50 Connector is a short route connecting SH-50 and SH-25. The entirety of the route is also known as South 1300 East. It connects SH-50 northbound with SH-25 southbound, and vice versa.

References

050
Transportation in Twin Falls County, Idaho
Transportation in Jerome County, Idaho